The Socialist Party of Florida (SPFL) is the Florida state chapter of the Socialist Party USA, a democratic socialist party. The SPFL appeared on ballots during the 2012 US presidential election in Florida and 2014 Florida gubernatorial election. It is no longer a registered political party in the state.

History and political activity

1901–1920

Establishment 
The first Socialist Party of America (SPA) local in Florida was founded in Orlando on November 18, 1901, a few months after the national party was founded. The original Socialist Party of Florida was founded as a part of the SPA, in July 1902. By 1904, it had more than fifty chapters. In July and August of that year county chapters in Manatee, Hillsborough and Duval would nominate candidates for local office who would all run without success. The state party would hold its first convention in Orlando sometime during the first week of July 1904 nominating several candidates to run governor and cabinet positions. During the early 1900s, the Socialist Party in Florida would be impacted by Jim Crow as African-American members were required to be members of their own local chapter separate from white ones or in the case there was an insufficient amount they would be members of the state party directly.

Election of Andrew Pettigrew in Manatee County 
During the 1906 elections, Manatee County would unexpectedly elect Andrew Jackson Pettigrew who was running under the Socialist Party as state representative defeating John A. Graham. Pettigrew had previously ran in 1904 for the same position but was unsuccessful. He had also previously served as the chairman of the Manatee County Socialist Party. During Pettigrew's campaign, journalist Claude L'Engle from the Florida Sun would question Graham's activities in Northern Florida which would end up benefitting Pettigrew at the expense of Graham. L'Engle accused him of swindling several people in several articles published in June and July 1906 which resulted in Graham filing a lawsuit in a circuit court for libel demanding $30,000 on August 2. L'Engle ended up endorsing Pettigrew that month and said voters in Manatee County should shy away from Graham.

1908 elections 
After the 1906 elections the party would generally be optimistic for 1908.  A second convention would be held in Tampa on July 4, 1908. Sixty delegates would attend with at least one coming from each of Florida's counties. The party would select its nominees for every state level office with the exception of the Attorney General. The convention would also select candidates to run its three congressional districts along with five electoral college members. Mrs. S. F. J. Linn who was the party's nominee for Superintendent of Schools that year would be the first female candidate to appear on the ballot in a state level race. She would also receive the highest percentage the Socialist Party would ever manage to achieve at 10.4% for a race at the state level.

St. Augustine 1913 municipal elections and inroads in surrounding areas 
During the summer of 1913 the party would make rounds in St. Augustine's municipal elections getting close to winning positions in the municipal government during a contentious campaign with the Democratic party but ended up losing by "only forty-eight votes". Nominees would be: David L. Dunham for mayor, T.J. Speisseger, Candido Meitin for an unknown position and Edgar Manucy for municipal judge. All of the party's nominees came from prominent families in the city and the rest of the party's support came from members of the city's working class. Socialists in St. Augustine showed less consideration for issues of race, ethnicity and class although the city overall was described as having an intense racial, ethnic and religious hierarchy to it. They would find more success in Longwood and Hastings which was located nearby where the party would elected justices of the peace for both locations.

Attempts to establish a newspaper 
A newspaper aligned with the party named Florida Beacon would also be launched in 1913 but only lasted for less than a year before it went bankrupt. Another attempt would be made to establish a newspaper for the party named Slege Hammer but it would end up facing the same issues that the Florida Beacon would have. Socialists in Florida would have the same difficulties that were faced at the national level when it came to establishing a media organ for them.

Decline of the party 
The party overall would begin to decline starting in 1917 with the United States' entry into World War I which ended up significantly hurting the party as many saw them as being traitors for not supporting the war effort. With the Russian Revolution occurring in November, much of the public nationally would turn against them. Federal and state officials would increase monitoring in Florida as a result with an emphasis being made on Tampa's Ybor City and West Tampa neighborhoods. By 1920 the party would become virtually irrelevant politically.

1920–present 
The Socialist Party of America voted 73:34 to change its name to Social Democrats, USA in December 1972. SPUSA was founded in 1973, after which the SPFL was founded on March 16, 1998.

The SPFL became inactive in about June 2011 and on December 20, 2011, the Florida Division of Elections revoked the status of the SPFL as a registered party in the State of Florida.

While the party was primarily an activist organization, it was also an official minor party in Florida, which enabled it to field candidates for office. The SPFL ran candidates for president in 2000 (David McReynolds) and 2004 (Walt Brown). In 2006, the SPFL attempted to field a write-in candidate for governor, but failed to gain eligibility. SPFL member Brian Moore was nominated to run for President in 2008 by the SP national convention. In 2010, SPFL member, David Maynard, was elected to the Hillsborough County Soil and Water Conservation Board.

The SPFL had locals in the county of Broward and the Tampa Bay Area.

Platform 
The SPFL is a democratic socialist organization. In 2004, the party described its position as:We believe the economy should be transformed into a socialist economy that is publicly owned and democratically controlled. The production of goods and services are created by the people and the benefits should be shared by everyone equitably. Our economy should focus on meeting people's basic needs such as healthcare, education, food and shelter, rather than profits.

A small percent of the public controls our resources and political power, while the rest of society is oppressed and excluded. Discrimination on the basis of race/ethnicity, gender, age, class, religion, ability/disability and sexual orientation prohibits us from working cooperatively for the benefit of the community.The SPFL endorsed the positions of anti-racism and socialist feminism, saying:As socialist-feminists, we differ from both those on the left who fail to recognize feminism as an essential aspect of human liberation, and from those parts of the feminist movement that believe that women's liberation can be achieved without a fundamental change in the economic system... We support independent organization by people of color to fight oppression. Racism will not be eliminated merely by eliminating capitalism.In the "Principles of the Socialist Party", the party says that it considers a socialist planned economy a way to solve ecological crises. The SPFL endorses full employment and cooperatives.

The SPFL was involved in the anti-war movements around Iraq and Afghanistan, working on behalf of the Coalition of Immokalee Workers, and opposing the anti gay marriage amendment effort. In addition, the SPFL worked on bringing a lawsuit against the State of Florida over violations of minor parties' First Amendment rights.

Elected officials
Formerly and currently elected Florida Socialists:

 Andrew Jackson Pettigrew, State Representative, Manatee County, 1907–1909
 C.C. Allen, State Representative, Pinellas County, 1909–1911
 John Dobler, Mayor, Gulfport, 1909–1911
 James Love, Mayor, Lake Worth, 1914–1916
David Maynard, Hillsborough County Soil & Water Conservation Board, Seat 5 2010-

Candidates for office

Gubernatorial candidates
 1908 — Andrew Jackson Pettigrew
 1912 — Thomas Cox
 1916 — C. C. Allen
 1920 —  Dr. Furman Whitaker

U.S. Senatorial candidates
 1916 — R. L. Goodwin
 1920 — M. J. Martin

U.S. Representatives candidates
1904
 2nd District — W. B Wood
 3rd District — George S. Smith

1906
 1st District — C. C. Allen
 3rd District — T. B. Meeker

1908
 1st District — C. C. Allen
 2nd District — A. N. Jackson
 3rd District — C. N. Wood

1910
 1st District — C. C. Allen
 2nd District — Thomas W. Cox
 3rd District — Eric Vonaxelson

1912
 1st District — C. C. Allen
 2nd District — J. J. Collins
 3rd District — W. N. Lamberry
 At-large — A. N. Jackson

1916
 1st District — Frank L. Sullivan
 4th District — A. N. Jackson

1920
 1st District — C. W. Smith
 2nd District — W. L. Case
 4th District — Earl Hunt

2008
20th District — Marc Luzietti

Election results

State Offices

Gubernatorial results

Federal offices

Presidential results
Since 1976, the Socialist Party USA has run a candidate for President of the United States. The party's nominee has been on the ballot in Florida in each election since 2000. The candidate who has received the highest vote total in Florida under the Socialist Party USA and nationally was former Oregon State Senator Walt Brown.

US Senatorial

US House

Logos
The Socialist Party of Florida near the end of its life had four official logos. The linked hands over the world is the official logo of the Socialist Party USA, while the red carnation is the former logo of the SPUSA. The use of both logos was approved by the State Executive Committee of the SPFL in July 2007. In May, 2008, the SEC approved the use of the Red Star Over Florida. In February, 2010, the SEC approved yet another new logo, based on the linked hands over the world and the red star over Florida.

Notes

1.Despite the Socialist Party of Florida becoming inactive in 2011, Maynard is apparently still a member of the Socialist Party USA, and in office as of the fall of 2016.

References

Further reading
 Griffin, R. S. (2008). Workers of the sunshine state unite!: The Florida Socialist Party during the Progressive Era, 1900–1920. The Florida Historical Quarterly, 86(3), 346–379.

External links
Socialist Party USA
Young People's Socialist League

Platform:
Socialist Party of the United States of America platform

Florida
Political parties in Florida
Florida